The women's triple jump event at the 1995 Summer Universiade was held on 1 September at the Hakatanomori Athletic Stadium in Fukuoka, Japan.

Results

References

Athletics at the 1995 Summer Universiade
1995 in women's athletics
1995